The Hnatyshyn Foundation Visual Arts Awards, the Award for Outstanding Achievement as an Artist and the Award for Curatorial Excellence in Contemporary Art are two annual arts awards of $25,000 and $10,000 that recognize mid-career Canadian visual artists and curators. The Hnatyshyn Foundation is a private charity established by Ray Hnatyshyn, Canada’s 24th Governor General.



2006 
It was won by Stan Douglas. 

It was juried by Scott Watson, Morris and Helen Belkin Art Gallery, Vancouver; Catherine Crowston, Art Gallery of Alberta, Edmonton; Darlene Coward Wight, Winnipeg Art Gallery; Kitty Scott, National Gallery of Canada, Ottawa; Serpentine Gallery, London (England); Paulette Gagnon, Musée d'art contemporain de Montréal; Robin Metcalfe, Saint Mary's University Art Gallery, Halifax.

2007 
 Award for Outstanding Achievement as an Artist: Ken Lum
 Award for Curatorial Excellence in Contemporary Art: Louise Déry

It was juried by Jon Tupper, Confederation Centre Art Gallery and Museum, Charlottetown; Christine Ross, Dept. of Art History, McGill University, Montreal; Diana Nemiroff, Carleton University Art Gallery, Ottawa; Robert Enright, arts journalist, Winnipeg; Liz Magor, artist, Vancouver.

2008 
 Award for Outstanding Achievement as an Artist: Janet Cardiff & George Bures Miller 
 Award for Curatorial Excellence in Contemporary Art: Barbara Fischer

It was juried by Christina Ritchie, Contemporary Art Gallery, Vancouver; Jeffrey Spalding, Glenbow Museum, Calgary; Louise Dompierre, Art Gallery of Hamilton; Marc Mayer, Musée d'art contemporain de Montréal; Marlene Creates, Artist, Portugal Cove, Newfoundland.

2009 
 Award for Outstanding Achievement as an Artist: Rebecca Belmore
 Award for Curatorial Excellence in Contemporary Art: Anthony Kiendl

It was juried by Ian Carr-Harris, artist, writer and educator, Ontario College of Art & Design, Toronto; Peter Dykhuis, Director/Curator, Dalhousie Art Gallery, Halifax; Timothy Long, Head Curator, MacKenzie Art Gallery, Regina; Joan Stebbins, Curator Emerita, Southern Alberta Art Gallery; Gaétane Verna, Executive Director at Musée d'art de Joliette, QC.

2010 
 Award for Outstanding Achievement as an Artist: Shary Boyle
 Award for Curatorial Excellence in Contemporary Art: Scott Watson  

It was juried by Loise Déry, Lisa Steele and Kim Tomczak, Ken Lum, Jon Tupper.

2011 
 Award for Outstanding Achievement as an Artist Geoffrey Farmer
 Award for Curatorial Excellence in Contemporary Art: Philip Monk

It was juried by Catherine Crowston, Deputy Director / Chief Curator of the Art Gallery of Alberta; Barbara Fischer, Executive Director/Chief Curator, Justina M. Barnicke Gallery, University of Toronto; Robert Fones, Visual Artist and Writer, Toronto; Angela Grauerholz, Director, Centre de design de l'UQAM, Professor, Artist, Montreal; Scott Watson, Director/Curator of the Morris and Helen Belkin Art Gallery, Vancouver.

2012 
 Award for Outstanding Achievement as an Artist: Lani Maestro
 Award for Curatorial Excellence in Contemporary Art: Nicole Gingras

It was juried by Robert Enright, contributing editor, Border Crossings magazine, and a research chair in art theory and criticism at the University of Guelph; Michael Fernandes, artist; Peggy Gale, independent curator; Stephen Horne, visiting scholar at the Jarislowsky Institute; Diana Nemiroff, curator and art historian.

2013 
 Award for Outstanding Achievement as an Artist: Marcel Dzama
 Award for Curatorial Excellence in Contemporary Art: Marie-Josée Jean

It was juried by Eve-Lyne Beaudry, Robert Enright, Peggy Gale, Diana Nemiroff, Nigel Prince.

2014 
 Award for Outstanding Achievement as an Artist: Kent Monkman
 Award for Curatorial Excellence: Daina Augaitis

It was juried by Lisa Baldissera – Chief Curator, Mendel Gallery; Robert Enright – Cultural journalist, writer and lecturer; Jenifer Papararo – Curator, Contemporary Art Gallery, Vancouver; Eric Walker – Painter and video artist; Sarah Watson – General and Artistic Director, Artexte.

2015 
 Award for Outstanding Achievement as an Artist: Pascal Grandmaison 
 Award for Curatorial Excellence in Contemporary Art: Candice Hopkins

It was juried by Louise Déry – Director, Galerie de l’UQAM; Dominique Fontaine – Curator and cultural advisor; Anthony Kiendl – Executive Director and CEO, MacKenzie Art Gallery; Lee-Ann Martin – Independent curator; Eric Walker – Senior visual and media artist.

2016 
 Award for Outstanding Achievement as an Artist: Peter Morin
 Award for Curatorial Excellence in Contemporary Art: Tania Willard

It was juried by Glenn Alteen, David Balzer, Marie-Éve Beaupré, David Garneau, Linda Graif.

2018 

 Award for Outstanding Achievement as an Artist: Maria Hupfield
 Award for Curatorial Excellence in Contemporary Art: Daina Warren

2019
 Award for Outstanding Achievement as an Artist: Dana Claxton
 Award for Curatorial Excellence: Catherine Bédard

References 

Canadian art awards